Guillermo García-López won in the singles competition in 2009, when the tournament was part of the ATP World Tour 250 series.
Andreas Seppi won in the final against Victor Crivoi 6–2, 6–1.

Seeds

Draw

Finals

Top half

Bottom half

References
 Main Draw
 Qualifying Draw

Austrian Open Kitzbuhel - Singles